Oral Ataniyazova is an obstetrician and medical scientist from Karakalpakstan, Uzbekistan. She is the director of Perzent, the Karakalpak Center for Reproductive Health and Environment. She was awarded the Goldman Environmental Prize in 2000. A year later, she became the rector of Tashkent Pediatric Medical Institute's Nukas Branch. The institute trains students in the field of environmental medicine, focusing on the human health nourishment that environmental pollution has caused. Moreover, Ataniyazova won a seat in the local Parliament of Republic Karakalpakstan in 2009. In a discussion about the impact The Goldman Prize has had on her career, she said that "These achievements helped me to be more helpful to my community and develop international collaboration to improve the environmental situation in my country.” She currently lives in Nukus, Uzbekistan.

After completing her PhD in medical sciences in Moscow, Ataniyazova conducted a survey in 1992 of 5,000 reproductive-age women in Karakalpakstan. The results were shocking, with over 90% of all women surveyed having some form of complication during pregnancy and/or childbirth.
 This has been attributed to the ecological disaster around the Aral Sea, which Karakalpakstan borders. In response to these findings, Ataniyazova founded the Karakalpak Center for Reproductive Health and Environment, named Perzent, which means progeny in the Karakalpak language. The center is located in the Nukus government hospital. It provides education to the local population about a wide range of issues, from family health to clean water and food.

Ataniyazova works to promote awareness of the problems around the Aral Sea. Using her expertise in reproductive health, she has been the keynote speaker for many world conferences, and has addressed the United Nations.

References

External links
 Oral Ataniyazova featuring in the documentary film Delta Blues
  
 

Year of birth missing (living people)
Living people
People from Nukus
Uzbekistani environmentalists
Goldman Environmental Prize awardees